The Minnesota Cup competition allows emerging Minnesota entrepreneurs and start-up companies to compete for the opportunity to meet investors and win prizes, including seed capital.

History
The Minnesota Cup competition started in 2005 by entrepreneurs Scott Litman and Dan Mallin. The first competition drew 600 entries who competed for $37,500 in prize money and professional services. The second annual competition introduced a student division and began on May 26, 2006. The competition has grown over time with the top prize increasing to $50,000 in 2008. In 2009, the competition expanded with the inclusion of categories for High Tech, Clean Tech and Renewable Energy, Social Entrepreneurship and BioSciences to go along with the existing General and Student Divisions. Additionally, prize money grew to $130,000. In 2016, The prize money for division winners and runners-up was $30,000 and $5,000, respectively. The grand prize winner got additional $50,000.

Winners
2005: ArcSwitch, Inc.
2006: Vast Enterprises
2007: Muve Inc.
2008: CoreSpine Technologies
2009: Alvenda Commerce Advertising
2010: EarthClean
2011: AUM Cardiovascular
2012: PreciouStatus
2013: Preceptis Medical
2014: 75F
2015: Astropad
2016: Stemonix
2020 Grand Prize: Blue Cube Bio

See also
OrthoCor (2012), BioScience Division winner

References

Economy of Minnesota
2005 establishments in Minnesota
Awards established in 2006